The 2020 Ukrainian Cup Final decided the winner of the 2019–20 Ukrainian Cup, the 29th season of the annual Ukrainian football cup competition. It was played on 8 July 2020 at the OSC Metalist Stadium in Kharkiv between Dynamo Kyiv and Vorskla Poltava. This was the fifth time the cup final would be held in Kharkiv after 2008, 2010, 2013 and 2017 finals.

Originally planned to be held on 13 May 2020 at Ternopilsky Misky Stadion in Ternopil, the final was later postponed to 8 July due to COVID-19 pandemic in Ukraine and first moved to Arena Lviv in Lviv, and then, considering the better epidemiological situation, to Kharkiv. Ternopil was granted the right to host the 2021 edition of the final instead. The match was played behind closed doors.

The winner Dynamo initially qualified to participate in the group stage of 2020–21 UEFA Europa League, however, it later qualified for 2020–21 UEFA Champions League after finishing as the league runners-up. The winner Dynamo Kyiv also qualified for the 2020 Ukrainian Super Cup, where it will face the champions of 2019–20 Ukrainian Premier League Shakhtar Donetsk.

Road to the final 

Both teams started their campaign in the Round of 16.

Note: In all results below, the score of the finalist is given first (H: home; A: away).

Previous encounters 
In overall, games among which started back in 1996, Dynamo Kyiv and Vorskla Poltava have previously met 53 times, from which 40 were won by Dynamo, 9 were drawn and 4 won by Vorskla. In the matches on the highest level the only previous meeting of the clubs was in the 2009 Ukrainian Super Cup, which was won by Dynamo in the penalty shoot-out 4–2 after 0–0 draw after the regular and extra time. It is going to be third meeting of the clubs in competitions of Ukrainian Cup where two previous played as part of the 2002–03 Ukrainian Cup was won by Dynamo (1–0, 4–0).

For Dynamo Kyiv, this final was the 17th overall, with 11 wins in the previous 16 final appearances. Vorskla played in their second Ukrainian Cup Final after 2009, when they defeated Shakhtar Donetsk 1–0 and won their only Ukrainian Cup to the date.

Match

 Note: position and roster number is per the Ukrainian Premier League (and Footboom)

See also
 2019–20 Ukrainian Premier League

Notes

References

External links 
 Dynamo – Vorskla game. FC Dynamo Kyiv. 8 July 2020.

Cup Final
Ukrainian Cup finals
Ukrainian Cup Final 2020
Ukrainian Cup Final 2020
Ukrainian Cup Final 2020
Ukrainian Cup Final
Ukrainian Cup Final 2020